Dannahue "Danny" Clarke is a British horticulturist who co-hosts the BBC series The Instant Gardener with Helen Skelton.

Clarke was born in Oxford to parents who immigrated from Jamaica. He changed careers from sales and founded his own garden design company in Bromley in 1997, and called himself The Black Gardener after noting that another businessman calling himself the Black Farmer was having success. The name led to him being noticed and invited to screen test for The Instant Gardener, a daytime BBC programme that ran for two seasons in 2015 and 2016. He also appeared as a presenter for the BBC on the RHS Chelsea and RHS Tatton Flower shows and Tree of the Year for Channel 4 in 2016.

References

External links
The Black Gardener

Living people
Black British television personalities
English gardeners
English people of Grenadian descent
Year of birth missing (living people)